Eva Birnerová and Michaëlla Krajicek were the defending champions, however both players chose not to participate.

Twin-sisters Lyudmyla and Nadiia Kichenok won the title, defeating French-duo Stéphanie Foretz and Irina Ramialison in the final, 6–3, 6–3.

Seeds

Draw

References 
 Draw

2015 ITF Women's Circuit